Abdounia recticona is an extinct species of requiem shark from the Eocene epoch. It is known from isolated teeth in Europe and North America.

References 

Carcharhinidae
Prehistoric sharks
Eocene sharks